Quassy Amusement Park is an amusement and waterpark in Middlebury, Connecticut, and is one of only 11 trolley parks still operating in the United States. It has 20 rides on its . Quassy consists of a full-fledged amusement park plus a waterpark called Splash Away Bay. Swimming in Lake Quassapaug is available. In 1901, a writer pronounced Lake Quassapaug as "the handsomest bit of natural water on Earth". Today, beach clubs and houses surround the entire lake. The park is home to the award-winning Wooden Warrior roller coaster, which opened in 2011. Quassy offers swimming, picnicking, a catering service, an arcade, a waterpark, and live entertainment including school bands, dance groups and magic shows.

The park uses an all-day ride and waterpark wristbands or pay-by-ride system. A wristband is required to enter the waterpark and beach area, or guests may pay a separate admission. Admission to the park is free but a parking fee is charged.

History

Quassy originally opened as a trolley park, owned and operated by an electrified rail line. It has been a staple in Connecticut entertainment for more than 100 years. In 1908, Quassy became a stop along the trolley line between Waterbury and Woodbury. As more people got off at this stop, Quassy became a summer resort area. In 1937, three businessmen purchased the property and began to develop it. After World War II, Quassy established itself as a full amusement park.

Rides and attractions

Defunct attractions

Gallery

See also
List of amusement parks in New England
Lake Compounce

References

External links

Middlebury, Connecticut
Tourist attractions in New Haven County, Connecticut
1908 establishments in Connecticut
Amusement parks in Connecticut
Amusement parks opened in 1908